A domestic short-haired cat is a cat possessing a coat of short fur, not belonging to any particular recognised cat breed. In Britain they are sometimes colloquially called moggies. Domestic short-haired cats are distinct from the British Shorthair, American Shorthair, and other standardized breeds with "Short-hair" names recognized by various registries. Domestic short-haired cats are the most common kind of cat in the United States, accounting for around 96% of their number. Other generic terms include house cat and alley cat (the latter may be used more specifically to refer to feral cats).

Description 
In the cat fancy, and among veterinarians and animal control agencies, domestic short-haired cats may be classified with organisation-specific terminology (often capitalized), such as: 
Domestic Shorthair (DSH)
 House Cat, Shorthair (HCS), or 
 Shorthair Household Pet.
Such a pseudo-breed is used for registry as well as shelter/rescue classification purposes. While not bred as show cats, some domestic short-haired cats are actually pedigreed and entered into cat shows that have non-purebred "Household Pet" divisions. Show rules vary; Fédération Internationale Féline (FIFe) permits "any eye colour, all coat colours and patterns, any coat length or texture, and any length of tail" (basically, any cat). Others may be more restrictive; an example from the World Cat Federation: "All classic colours are permitted. Any amount of white is permitted. The colours chocolate and cinnamon, as well as their dilution (lilac and fawn) are not recognized in any combinations (bicolour, tricolour, tabby). The pointed pattern is also not recognized. The description of colours is listed in the general list of colours."

Domestic short-haired cats are characterised by a wide range of colouring, and typically "revert to type" after a few generations, which means they express their coats as a tabby cat. This can be any colour or combination of colours. They also exhibit a wide range of physical characteristics, and as a result, domestic short-haired cats in different countries tend to look different in body shape and size, as they are working from differing gene pools. DSH cats in Asia tend to have a build similar to a "classic" Siamese or Tonkinese, while European and American varieties have a thicker, heavier build. Cats that did not go through selective breeding are much less vulnerable to the genetic problems for which purebred cats must be carefully screened, due to their diverse gene pool.

Since freely breeding domestic short-haired cats form distinctive landraces in wide geographic areas, they have been the basis of several recent formal breeds such as the European Shorthair (Celtic Shorthair), and American Shorthair.

Obesity is a common disease in pet cats. However, adult obesity is not significantly affected by birth weight and litter size.

See also 
 Domestic long-haired cat

References

Cat landraces